Oedaleosia is a genus of moths in the subfamily Arctiinae.

Species
 Oedaleosia concolor Strand, 1912
 Oedaleosia frontalis Strand, 1909
 Oedaleosia nigricosta Hampson, 1900

References

Natural History Museum Lepidoptera generic names catalog

Lithosiini
Moth genera